The Neill–Cochran House Museum is a historic home in north-central Austin, Texas. Master builder Abner Cook designed and built the house in 1855 as a suburban estate many years before the surrounding area was settled by other homes and businesses. The two-story Greek Revival home features prominent Doric columns and Mr. Cook's signature "sheaf of wheat" balusters.

History
In 1856, it was leased to the Texas Institute for the Blind, currently known as the Texas School for the Blind and Visually Impaired, to serve as its first home until Abner Cook finished the school's campus across town.

Subsequently, the House was leased by Lt. Governor Fletcher Stockdale and, it is believed, former Provisional Governor Andrew J. Hamilton. At the end of the Civil War, Federal troops converted the House into a hospital. General George Armstrong Custer was stationed in Austin during Reconstruction, occupying the blind school and, no doubt, visit the Neill–Cochran House.

In 1876, the home was sold to Colonel Andrew Neill, a Confederate veteran. Neill lived there with his wife Jennie Chapman Neill, who stayed on after Neill's death and in 1893 rented the home to Judge Thomas Beauford Cochran.

Cochran purchased the home outright in 1895 for his family and expanded and modernized the home. In 1958, the Cochran family sold the property to The National Society of the Colonial Dames of America in The State of Texas. The NSCDA operates the home today as a historic house museum. The Neill–Cochran House Museum is listed on the National Register of Historic Places and is a Texas Historical Commission landmark.

In 2007, White Rabbit Adventure Games published a walk-through computer adventure game based on the Neill–Cochran House. The game, "Sterling's Gift", features a fictional story based on published memoirs and diaries that helps the player solve a 150-year-old mystery involving George Custer's wife Libbie. Royalties from the sale of this unique game go to the Neill–Cochran House Museum.

Gallery

References

External links

 Neill–Cochran Museum
 Sterling's Gift Website

Houses on the National Register of Historic Places in Texas
Houses in Austin, Texas
Historic house museums in Texas
Museums in Austin, Texas
Greek Revival houses in Texas
National Society of the Colonial Dames of America
National Register of Historic Places in Austin, Texas
Recorded Texas Historic Landmarks
City of Austin Historic Landmarks